The 2020–21 Wake Forest Demon Deacons men's basketball team represented Wake Forest University during the 2020–21 NCAA Division I men's basketball season. The Demon Deacons were led by first-year head coach Steve Forbes and played their home games at the Lawrence Joel Veterans Memorial Coliseum in Winston-Salem, North Carolina as members of the Atlantic Coast Conference.

The Demon Deacons finished the season 6–16, 3–15 in ACC play, to finish in fourteenth place.  They lost to Notre Dame in the first round of the ACC tournament.  They were not invited to either the NCAA tournament or NIT.

Previous season
The Demon Deacons finished 2019–20 season 13–17, 6–14 in ACC play to finish in a tie for 13th place. They lost to Pittsburgh in the first round of the ACC tournament.  The tournament was cancelled before the Quarterfinals due to the COVID-19 pandemic.  The NCAA tournament and NIT were also cancelled due to the pandemic.

After the season head coach Danny Manning was fired after six seasons, where he posted a 78–111 record.  On April 30, 2020, the Demon Deacons hired Steve Forbes as his replacement.

Offseason

Departures

Incoming transfers

2020 recruiting class

Roster

Schedule and results

Source:

|-
!colspan=12 style=| Regular season

|-
!colspan=12 style=| ACC tournament

Rankings

*AP does not release post-NCAA tournament rankings^Coaches did not release a Week 2 poll.

References

Wake Forest Demon Deacons men's basketball seasons
Wake Forest
Wake Forest Demon Deacons men's basketball
Wake Forest Demon Deacons men's basketball